Francisco Gabriel Ortega (born 19 March 1999) is an Argentine professional footballer who plays as a left-back for Velez Sarsfield.

Club career
Ortega's career began in Palmeiras's system, originally arriving in 2013. He made his senior professional debut for the club in November 2017, during a 3–0 home victory over Olimpo. Throughout the rest of the 2017–18 campaign, Ortega made ten further league appearances.

International career
June 2017 saw Ortega train with the Argentina national team in Australia and Singapore. In 2018, Ortega received a call-up for the Argentina U20s for friendlies with England U18s and Real Madrid Castilla. He played the full duration of a 2–1 defeat to England on 23 March. In December, Ortega was selected for the 2019 South American U-20 Championship. After appearing six times in Chile, Ortega was called up for the 2019 FIFA U-20 World Cup in Poland. In the succeeding September, Ortega was picked by the U23s ahead of a friendly with Bolivia. In Argentina’s opening match of the 2021 Olympic Games Ortega was sent off after receiving a second yellow card.

Career statistics
.

References

External links

1999 births
Living people
Argentine footballers
Footballers from Santa Fe, Argentina
Association football fullbacks
Argentina youth international footballers
Argentina under-20 international footballers
Olympic footballers of Argentina
Footballers at the 2020 Summer Olympics
Argentine Primera División players
Club Atlético Vélez Sarsfield footballers